The singer, songwriter and actress "Lil' Kim" (Kimberley Denise Jones) has appeared in a wide variety of music videos, films and television commercials since the 1990s. She has also written many songs for film and television.

Music videos

Lead artist videos

Cameo appearances

Collaboration Videos

As Featured Artist

Filmography

Television

Films

Video Games

Featured music
List of Lil' Kim songs used in film and television. For soundtrack appearances see Lil' Kim discography.

Source:

Commercials

References

Hip hop discographies
Discographies of American artists
Videographies of American artists